Limmer Holdings was a major contracting business based in London.

History
The Company was founded circa 1881 as the Limmer & Trinidad Lake Asphalt Company with the objective of undertaking road contracting using high quality asphalt from Limmer in Germany and from the Pitch Lake in Trinidad. The company was based in Carnwarth Road in Fulham and secured major contracts for surfacing the roads of London. The asphalt was imported and the stone came by barge from Scotland. The Company was acquired by Tarmac in 1971.

References

External links
Photograph of a Limmer & Trinidad truck

1810 establishments in England
Companies based in the London Borough of Hammersmith and Fulham
British companies established in 1810